"Dreamline" is a song by the Canadian rock band Rush. It was released as a single and on their 1991 album Roll the Bones. The song peaked at number one on the U.S. Mainstream Rock Tracks chart, and was a staple for live performances by Rush, having been performed on every tour from the inaugural Roll the Bones Tour until the 2010 and 2011 Time Machine Tour, when it was dropped. It was performed during the subsequent Clockwork Angels Tour, where it was accompanied by the Clockwork Angels string ensemble and a video with a dedication to Neil Armstrong. It was dropped again on the 2015 R40 Tour. In live performances, the bridge was extended to incorporate a solo by Alex Lifeson.

Bassist and singer Geddy Lee said: "I love the spirit of 'Dreamline' and the way Neil captures that feeling of wanderlust and invulnerability that comes in a particular trying time in your life."

Reception
Martin Popoff said that the song is "strafed by a crouching-then-striking verse and clouds-breaking chorus. It is a track that proved to be strong enough to open the Different Stages live album seven years later and then stay tenaciously in the set for the Vapor Trails tour."
 
AllMusic writer Eduardo Rivadavia called the song "gutsy" and also said that "Dreamline" is one of their best songs from the '90s.

Track listing

Personnel
Geddy Lee - synthesizer, bass, vocals
Alex Lifeson - acoustic and electric guitars, vocals
Neil Peart - drums, lyrics

See also
List of Billboard Mainstream Rock number-one songs of the 1990s
List of Rush songs

References

1991 singles
1991 songs
Rush (band) songs
Songs written by Neil Peart
Songs written by Geddy Lee
Song recordings produced by Rupert Hine
Atlantic Records singles